The Shire of Mareeba is a local government area at the base of Cape York Peninsula in Far North Queensland, inland from Cairns.

On 20 March 2013, Mareeba residents voted in favour of a proposal to reverse the amalgamation and to re-establish Mareeba Shire.  The new Mareeba Shire was re-established on 1 January 2014.

History

The Woothakata Division, based in the mining town of Thornborough on the Hodgkinson goldfield, was created on 11 November 1879 as one of 74 divisions around Queensland under the Divisional Boards Act 1879 with a population of 1836. Woothakata is a Wakaman and Kuku Djungan Aboriginal word which describes the way (the journey) they travelled to Ngarrabullgan/Mount Mulligan, an important meeting place. The name Woothakata lives on as the name of a property at Chillagoe.

On 3 September 1881, the Tinaroo Division was created under the Divisional Boards Act 1879 out of parts of the Cairns, Hinchinbrook and Woothakata Divisions.

On 18 May 1889, the tin-mining area at Stannary Hills and Irvinebank and its hinterland in and around the Walsh River (an area of 4110 sq miles) were severed from Woothakata Division to create Walsh Division.

On 20 December 1890, part of the Tinaroo Division was excised to create the new Barron Division, closer to Cairns.

With the passage of the Local Authorities Act 1902, the Divisions of Woothakata, Tinaroo and Barron became Shires of Woothaka, Tinaroo and Barron on 31 March 1903.

On 16 December 1908, a small part of Shire of Woothakata was transferred to the Shire of Walsh, which was then split with one part being proclaimed the new Shire of Chillagoe, based at Chillagoe.

In 1919, Woothakata's seat of administration moved to Mareeba. Thornborough had declined steadily in importance, having a population of 58 in 1921 and 29 in 1933. The same year, on 20 December, the Shire of Barron was abolished, with its area being split between the Shire of Mulgrave and Shire of Woothakata.

On 25 June 1932, the Shires of Walsh and Chillagoe merged into the Shire of Woothakata, which was then organised into six divisions, of which the former Shires of Chillagoe and Walsh formed the greater part of the sixth division. Division 3 had 2 representatives and all the other divisions had only one representative.

On 20 December 1947, the Shire of Woothakata was renamed the Shire of Mareeba.

A new Mareeba Shire Hall was built in Mareeba in 1961; it was added to the Queensland Heritage Register on 11 October 2013.

On 22 March 1995, parts of the Shires of Mareeba and Douglas and the whole of the abolished Shire of Mulgrave were added to the City of Cairns.

On 15 March 2008, under the Local Government (Reform Implementation) Act 2007 passed by the Parliament of Queensland on 10 August 2007, the Shire of Mareeba merged with the Shires of Atherton, Eacham and Herberton to form the Tablelands Region.

In 2012, a proposal was made to de-amalgamate the Shire of Mareeba from the Tablelands Region. On 9 March 2013, the citizens of the former Mareeba shire voted in a referendum to de-amalgamate. The shire was re-established on 1 January 2014.

Towns and localities
The Shire of Mareeba includes the following settlements:

 Mareeba
 Almaden
 Amber
 Arbouin
 Arriga
 Barwidgi
 Bellevue
 Biboohra
 Bilwon
 Bolwarra
 Bulleringa
 Chewko
 Chillagoe
 Crystalbrook 
 Desailly
 Dimbulah
 Forty Mile
 Fossilbrook

 Gamboola
 Glen Russell
 Groganville
 Highbury
 Hurricane
 Irvinebank
 Julatten
 Kingsborough
 Koah
 Kowrowa
 Kuranda
 Lyndside
 Mona Mona
 Mount Carbine
 Mount Carbine Tableland
 Mount Molloy
 Mount Mulgrave
 Mount Mulligan

 Munderra
 Mungana
 Mutchilba
 Myola
 Paddys Green
 Petford
 Ravensworth
 Red River
 Rookwood
 Southedge
 Speewah
 Springfield
 Staaten
 Strathmore
 Thornborough
 Watsonville
 Wrotham

Note:
 Prior to 1996, the Shire of Mareeba also included the localities of Barron Gorge, Lamb Range and Redlynch to the west of Cairns. These were incorporated into the City of Cairns.

Libraries 
Mareeba Shire Council operate public libraries at Chillagoe, Dimbulah, Kuranda and Mareeba.

Population

Chairmen and mayors

In early years the elected councillors chose one among them to the chairman on an annual basis.
The following are the chairmen of the Woothakata Division and Shire of Woothakata:
 1890–1907: George Jonathan Evenden
 1920: James Harris
From 1921, chairmen of shires were elected by the voters for a period of 3 years.
 August 1921: Ernest Albert Atherton
 1927, 1929, 1931: George Henry O'Donnell

The following are the chairmen in the first incarnation of Shire of Mareeba:
 1933–1935, December 1939: William Gardner
 December 1939: J. M. Brown
 1950: J. M. Brown
 1973–1976: Martin Tenni, Member of the Queensland Legislative Assembly for Barron River

The following are the mayors in the current incarnation of Shire of Mareeba:
2014–2020: Tom Gilmore, former Member of the Queensland Legislative Assembly for Tablelands
2020–present : Angela Toppin

References

External links
 
 

 
Far North Queensland
1879 establishments in Australia
Local government areas of Queensland
Former local government areas of Queensland
2008 disestablishments in Australia
Populated places disestablished in 2008
2014 establishments in Australia